Igor Yuryevich Shpilband (born July 14, 1964) is an American ice dancing coach and former competitor for the Soviet Union. He is the 1983 World Junior champion with former partner Tatiana Gladkova.

Personal life
Shpilband was born in Moscow on July 14, 1964, to a Jewish family. In 1990, he and several other Soviet skaters were part of a U.S. tour headlined by Jayne Torvill and Christopher Dean when one of them, Gorsha Sur, decided to defect; Shpilband, Veronica Pershina and Elena Krykanova decided to join him.

Shpilband got a coaching position in Detroit not long after. He became a naturalized United States citizen in 2000. With his former wife Veronica Pershina, he has a daughter, Ekaterina, a competitive figure skater for the United States. In 2006, he became engaged to skating coach Adrienne Lenda.

Competitive and coaching career

Shpilband was coached by Lyudmila Pakhomova from age 12 to 20. He and his partner, Tatiana Gladkova, won the silver medal at the 1982 World Junior Championships and then gold in 1983. Shpilband retired from competitive skating following Pakhomova's death in 1986.

Following his defection, he began working as a coach and choreographer at the Detroit Skating Club. Gorsha Sur recommended him as a coach to Elizabeth Punsalan and Jerod Swallow, who were among his first students. Shpilband formerly worked in collaboration with British coach Elizabeth Coates. He began coaching with Marina Zueva in 2001. In 2003, Shpilband began coaching at the Arctic Edge Arena in Canton, Michigan. On June 3, 2012, Shpilband confirmed that he had been fired from the Arctic Edge Arena. On June 12, it was announced that his new training site is the Novi Ice Arena in Novi, Michigan, and American ice dancers Madison Chock/Evan Bates confirmed that they would train with Shpilband in Novi. They were joined soon after by Isabella Tobias/Deividas Stagniūnas of Lithuania.

Shpilband is currently coaching the following skaters:

 Yura Min / Daniel Eaton 
 Eva Pate / Logan Bye 
 Robynne Tweedale / Joseph Buckland 

Shpilband has coached the following skaters:
 Alisa Agafonova / Dmitri Dun
 Eve Chalom / Mathew Gates
 Alissandra Aronow / Zachary Donohue
 Tanith Belbin White / Benjamin Agosto
 Anna Cappellini / Luca Lanotte (co-coach, with Paola Mezzadri from June 2012-July 2014)
 Christina Carreira / Anthony Ponomarenko
 Madison Chock / Greg Zuerlein (until June 2011)
 Madison Chock / Evan Bates (from July 2011 to May 2018) 
 Penny Coomes / Nicholas Buckland (from May 2015)
 Katherine Copely / Deividas Stagniūnas  
 Charlotte Lichtman / Dean Copely
 Meryl Davis / Charlie White (until June 2012)
 Margarita Drobiazko / Povilas Vanagas
 Grethe Grünberg / Kristian Rand
 Jessica Joseph / Charles Butler
 Jessica Joseph / Brandon Forsyth
 Siobhan Karam / Joshua McGrath
 Naomi Lang / Peter Tchernyshev
 Kavita Lorenz / Joti Polizoakis
 Caitlin Mallory / Kristian Rand
 Lydia Manon / Ryan O'Meara
 Lydia Manon / Brandon Forsyth 
 Yura Min / Alexander Gamelin
 Oleksandra Nazarova / Maxim Nikitin
 Avonley Nguyen / Vadym Kolesnik
 Nathalie Pechalat / Fabian Bourzat, from May 2013 to March 2014.
 Justyna Plutowska / Peter Gerber
 Elliana Pogrebinsky / Alex Benoit
 Elizabeth Punsalan / Jerod Swallow
 Thea Rabe / Timothy Koleto 
 Jamie Silverstein / Ryan O'Meara
 Jamie Silverstein / Justin Pekarek
 Lauren Senft / Leif Gislason
 Lauren Senft / Augie Hill
 Maia Shibutani / Alex Shibutani (until June 2012)
 Isabella Tobias / Deividas Stagniūnas 
 Isabella Tobias / Ilia Tkachenko
 Tessa Virtue / Scott Moir (until June 2012)
 Megan Wing / Aaron Lowe
 Katarina Wolfkostin / Jeffrey Chen (until May 2022) 
 Yu Xiaoyang / Wang Chen
 Diana Davis / Gleb Smolkin

Competitive highlights
(with Gladkova)

References

Soviet male ice dancers
American figure skating coaches
American people of Russian-Jewish descent
Jewish American sportspeople
Figure skating choreographers
Soviet defectors to the United States
Living people
Figure skaters from Moscow
World Junior Figure Skating Championships medalists
1964 births
21st-century American Jews